Heroes Den Bosch is a Dutch professional basketball club based in 's-Hertogenbosch. The club plays in the BNXT League since 2021 and in the top basketball division in the Netherlands since 1972. Founded as EBBC in 1951, the club had several sponsored names the following decades.

Den Bosch has won a record seventeen Dutch championships, seven Dutch Cup and two Dutch Supercup titles. The team has also been a regular at European competitions, most recently the FIBA Europe Cup. Heroes plays their home games at the Maaspoort, which has a capacity of approximately 2,700 people.

History
On 18 October 1952, Eerste Bossche Basketball Club (EBBC) was founded by Cees Vossen, Tom van der Leur, Hans van Oorschot and Frans van de Wiel. In 1962, Den Bosch played in the top division Eredivisie for the first time, but not very successful. Subsequently the team was relegated again. In 1979, EBBC won its first title. In 1980, the team became Nashua Den Bosch after its new main sponsor. Its increased budget led to six consecutive Dutch titles between 1982 and 1987.

Nashua Den Bosch in the 1980s 

In December 1979, Nashua signed as the club's new main sponsor. In the next 10 years, Nashua won 9 national championships and was close to the European top clubs. Star players such as Tom Barker, Dan Cramer, Mitchell Plaat, David Lawrence, Henk Pieterse, Paul Thompson and Mike Reddick played for Nashua in this decade.

Den Bosch changed its home arena to the newly built Maaspoort, increasing its home capacity from 1,200 to 3,500. Nashua played in the 1979 FIBA Intercontinental Cup.

EiffelTowers (2005–2013)
Decades later, in June 2005, Den Bosch merged with EiffelTowers Nijmegen to form EiffelTowers Den Bosch. Following the merger the club had one of the largest budgets in the Netherlands, and with that they were able to attract high-quality players. In their first season they had immediate success by winning the Dutch League title. The year after that (2006–07) EiffelTowers The Bosch would win the title again after a clean sweep against the Matrixx Magixx, after losing only four games in the regular season. The two following years, Den Bosch reached the finals, but lost twice to Amsterdam.

In 2012, EiffelTowers won its fifteenth Dutch championship, after beating ZZ Leiden 1–4 in a best-of-seven-series.

SPM Shoeters (2013–2016)

After 13 years playing as the EiffelTowers, in 2013, the club changed its name to SPM Shoeters as a reference to its new main sponsor SPM Shoes and Boots, a shoe producer based in Waalwijk. Along with the name change the club changed the team colors to black, after playing in red since 2000. 

In the 2014–15 season, Shoeters won its sixteenth DBL championship after Donar was beaten 4–1 in the Finals. The team also performed excellently in the EuroChallenge that season, reaching the Top 16. Star of the season for Den Bosch was Brandyn Curry, who was named DBL Playoffs MVP.

After the 2015–16 season, it was revealed that Shoeters was dealing with serious financial problems which had the team on the edge of bankruptcy.

New Heroes (2016–2019)
In October 2016, the team was bought by Triple Double BV, a sports marketing enterprise. Owner of the company Bob van Oosterhout took over the club which was no longer in danger of dissolution. On 6 November 2016, Den Bosch found a new main sponsor and subsequently was named New Heroes Basketball after signing a three-year deal with the local online training platform New Heroes. In its first season as New Heroes, the club finished fourth in the DBL and was swept by Donar in the semi-finals.

In the 2017–18 season, Croatian coach Silvano Poropat signed a two-year contract. Under Poropat, Heroes finished fourth once again but was eliminated in the quarterfinals by Rotterdam Basketbal. Following the disappointing season, Poropat and Heroes parted ways.

On 31 May 2018, Kees Akerboom Jr. announced his retirement at age 34. Akerboom, who played 11 seasons for the club, had his jersey number 12 retired.

For the 2018–19 season, Ivica Skelin was appointed as head coach. This season, New Heroes played in the FIBA Europe Cup after a European absence of 3 years. In Group D, Heroes had a 3–3 record and finished in third place. In the DBL playoffs, Den Bosch was once again eliminated in the semifinals, this time by Landstede.

Heroes Den Bosch (2019–present)
On 21 August 2019, the club announced it was changing its name to Heroes Den Bosch and it is not planning to change the club name anymore. In June, Heroes signed Jean-Marc Jaumin as its new head coach.

On 15 June 2021, Heroes signed three-time DBL champion Erik Braal as head coach. In the 2021–22 season, the DBL merged with the PBL into the BNXT League, in which the national leagues of Belgium and the Netherlands are combined. On 29 May 2022, Heroes ended a 7-year drought when it won its seventeenth national championship, beating ZZ Leiden in the finals series 3–2.

Sponsorship names
Due to sponsorship reasons, Heroes Den Bosch has known a lot of names over the years:

Logos

Home arenas 

After many successful seasons by Nashua Den Bosch in the 1980s, a true basketball hall was built with the Maaspoort. The arena was opened on 3 September 1982 with a game against the NBA All-Stars.

 De Vinkenkamp 
 Maaspoort: 1982–present

Honours

Domestic 
Dutch National Champions (record)
 Winners (17): 1978–79, 1979–80, 1980–81, 1982–83, 1983–84, 1984–85, 1985–86, 1986–87, 1987–88, 1992–93, 1995–96, 1996–97, 2005–06, 2006–07, 2011–12, 2014–15, 2021–22
Dutch Cup (record)
 Winners (7): 1992–93, 1999–00, 2001–02, 2007–08, 2008–09, 2012–13, 2015–16
Dutch SuperCup
 Winners (3): 2013, 2015, 2022
Ricoh Cup
 Winners (1): 2000

European 
FIBA Saporta Cup
 Runner-up (1): 1978–79

Worldwide 
FIBA Intercontinental Cup
 Runners-up (1): 1982

Friendly 
Haarlem Basketball Week
 Winners (1): 2006

All-time records

Most Dutch Basketball League champions (17 championships)
Most games played: Kees Akerboom, Jr. (671 games)

Players

Retired numbers

Current roster

Depth chart

Notable players

Season by season

European record

Notes

List of head coaches

References

External links
Official website 
Eurobasket.com Den Bosch Page

 
Basketball teams in the Netherlands
Sports clubs in 's-Hertogenbosch
Basketball teams established in 1952
Dutch Basketball League teams